Dan Sanker is an American businessman, and the President & CEO of CaseStack, LLC, a logistics outsourcing company focused on collaboration and technology he founded in California in 1999. He previously worked in consumer packaged goods at Procter and Gamble and Nabisco, and for corporate finance consulting firms KPMG and Deloitte. Sanker is also a co-founder and Executive Director of the Green Valley Network, a non-profit organization which promotes sustainability technology and received the Annual Southern Innovators Award from the Southern Growth Policies Board.

Sanker has been recognized by Supply & Demand Chain Executive magazine as a "Green Supply Chain Professional to Know". He was a finalist for the Ernst & Young Entrepreneur of the Year Award in May 2011. His company also received the Compass Communications Excellence Award for the Green Consolidation Program. Under Sanker's leadership, CaseStack grew quickly, earning spots on Deloitte's Technology Fast 50 and the Inc. 500.

Sanker received a BA in Economics from Trinity College (Connecticut), an MBA from the Anderson School at UCLA, and studied at the University of London, IES in Vienna, and Kansai Gaidai University in Hirakata City, Japan. He has been accredited by the UCLA Director Certification Program and serves as a Board Member at the Center for Retailing Excellence at the Sam M. Walton College of Business at the University of Arkansas. He is the author of the book, Collaborate! The Art of We, published by Jossey-Bass.

References 

Living people
American chief executives
UCLA Anderson School of Management alumni
Year of birth missing (living people)
Place of birth missing (living people)